Paul Schemel is an American lawyer and politician serving as a member of the Pennsylvania House of Representatives from the 90th district in Franklin County, Pennsylvania.

Career 
Schemel opposes the legalization of cannabis in Pennsylvania. After the 2020 United States presidential election, Schemel was one of 26 Pennsylvania House Republicans who called for withdrawing certification of presidential electors.

Schemel currently sits on the Environmental Resources & Energy, Health, Judiciary, and State Government committees.

Rep. Schemel made an unsuccessful attempt at becoming minority leader of the Pennsylvania House of Representatives in 2022.

References

External links
Official Web Site
PA House profile

Living people
People from Franklin County, Pennsylvania
Republican Party members of the Pennsylvania House of Representatives
1971 births
21st-century American politicians